Caitlyn Shadbolt is the debut extended play by Australian recording artist Caitlyn Shadbolt. The album was released on 21 August 2015.

Track listing

Charts

Release history

References

2015 debut EPs
Caitlyn Shadbolt albums
EPs by Australian artists